Chininae is a subfamily of Asian grasshoppers in the family Chorotypidae based on the type genus China. There are currently two known genera and about nine described species, found in southern China and Southeast Asia. The subfamily was first formally erected in 1899.

Genera
These two genera belong to the subfamily Chininae:
 China Burr, 1899 - monotypic China mantispoides from China and Indochina
 Eupatrides Brunner von Wattenwyl, 1898 - Malesia

References

Chorotypidae
Orthoptera of Asia